Zonula occludens-1 ZO-1, also known as Tight junction protein-1 is a 220-kD peripheral membrane protein that is encoded by the TJP1 gene in humans. It belongs to the family of zonula occludens proteins (ZO-1, ZO-2, and ZO-3), which are tight junction-associated proteins and of which, ZO-1 is the first to be cloned. It was first isolated in 1986 by Stevenson and Goodenough using a monoclonal antibody raised in rodent liver to recognise a 225-kD polypeptide in whole liver homogenates and in tight junction-enriched membrane fractions. It has a role as a scaffold protein which cross-links and anchors Tight Junction (TJ) strand proteins, which are fibril-like structures within the lipid bilayer, to the actin cytoskeleton.

Function 

This gene encodes a protein located on a cytoplasmic membrane surface of intercellular tight junctions. The encoded protein may be involved in signal transduction at cell–cell junctions. Two transcript variants encoding distinct isoforms have been identified for this gene.

Interactions 

Tight junction protein 1 has been shown to interact with:

 F11 receptor, 
 GJA3, 
 GJA8,
 Gap junction protein, alpha 1, 
 KIRREL, 
 MLLT4, 
 Occludin, 
 TJP3,  and
 Tight junction protein 2.

See also 
 Tight junction

References

Further reading

External links